The Avro 636 was a single-engined British fighter-trainer built by Avro in the mid-1930s. Four were built for the Irish Air Corps.

Development
The Avro 636 was designed in November 1934 by Roy Chadwick, Avro's chief designer as a one or two-seat fighter-trainer, and was planned to reproduce the flying characteristics of single-seat fighters. It had a similar structure to the Tutor, with a welded steel tube fuselage.

The aircraft was designed to be operated as a single or two seater, with the provision for fitting two forward firing .303 in (7.7 mm) Vickers machine guns.

Operational history
Four Avro 636s were ordered by the Irish Air Corps in December 1934. These aircraft were powered by old Armstrong Siddeley Jaguar IVC engines, which had originally been purchased by the Irish in 1930 for use in Vickers Vespa army co-operation aircraft. Although the Jaguar IVC powered aircraft was planned to be designated as the Avro 667, they were always referred to as Avro 636s.

The four aircraft were delivered in August 1935, and remained in service for several years.

Variants
Avro 636 Basic design, originally planned to be powered by 420 hp (313 kW) Armstrong Siddeley Jaguar IV engine.
Avro 636A Version powered by 680 hp (510 kW) Armstrong Siddeley Panther XI engine.
Avro 667 Version powered by unsupercharged 460 hp (340 kW) Armstrong Siddeley Jaguar IVC. Four built for Irish Air Corps. Known as Avro 636 in service.

Operators

Irish Air Corps

Specifications (Avro 667)

References

Single-engined tractor aircraft
1930s British military trainer aircraft
636
Biplanes
Aircraft first flown in 1935